The East Is Blue is an essay by Salman Rushdie about the subversive potential of pornography in Asia and the Muslim world. It was published  in 2004 in Timothy Greenfield-Sanders' book XXX: 30 Porn Star Photographs.

Rushdie argues that the Muslim society in the East is considered to be closed and very shy on the issue of sex, but is currently being bombarded by the influxes of globalization which many political and religious authorities are still trying to suppress.
In this context, the consumption of pornography does not only serve the purpose of sexual stimulation, but becomes an act of political rebellion. Rushdie refers to various examples from India, Pakistan and Iran to demonstrate the authorities' unsuccessful fight against the invasion of pornography in everyday life. 
Rushdie does not consider pornography as political in itself, though. He defines its consumption as a symptom of a social or political discomfort.

References
 Porn is vital to freedom, says Rushdie, The Sunday Times, 8 August 2004

Salman Rushdie
2004 essays
Non-fiction books about pornography
Pornography in Asia
Indian pornography
Pakistani pornography
Works about Indian politics
Works about Pakistani politics
Indian essay collections